"Scatman's World" is a song by American artist Scatman John, released in June 1995 as the second single from the album of the same name. It was the follow-up to the international hit "Scatman (Ski Ba Bop Ba Dop Bop)" and reached number-one in Belgium (in both Flanders and Wallonia), Finland, France, Germany, Hungary and Spain. On the Eurochart Hot 100, it became Scatman John's second number-one hit in August 1995. The song uses a similar, repeating chord progression to Pachelbel's Canon, the latter follows as: I V vi iii IV I IV V and the former as: I V vi iii IV I ii V.

Critical reception
James Masterton said in his weekly UK chart commentary in Dotmusic, "Now he is back with the followup in pretty much the same vein. Without the novelty value of the first hit it will be interesting to see if this manages to top the Number 3 peak of its predecessor." James Hyman from Music Weeks RM Dance Update wrote, "Currently number one in Germany and hitting hard across the rest of Europe, more novelty Euro from a 53-year-old former jazz singer and pianist. Semi-social scat-raps reside over a backing track not too dissimilar from his previous 'Scatman' single as well as Village People's 'Go West'." 

Chart performance
"Scatman's World" was extremely successful on the charts in Europe, peaking at number-one in Belgium, Finland, France, Germany, Hungary and Spain, as well as on the Eurochart Hot 100 and MTV's European Top 20. It reached the Top 10 also in Austria, Denmark, Iceland, Ireland, Italy (number 2), the Netherlands, Norway, Scotland, Sweden, Switzerland and the UK. In the latter, the single peaked at number 10 in its second week at the UK Singles Chart, on September 3, 1995. Outside Europe, it charted on the RPM Dance/Urban chart in Canada, peaking at number 21. And in Australia, it reached number 84. The single earned a gold record in Austria, France and Switzerland. In Germany, it was awarded with a platinum record.

Music video
The accompanying music video for "Scatman's World" was directed by Zowie Broach. It begins with a news reporter standing "outside the world of Scatman" and declaring how people appear happy upon leaving such an establishment. He turns to a young boy and asks why he is visiting, only for the boy to declare that he is bored and that there is nothing to do; confusing him. The footage cuts to the young boy suddenly submerged in water as he sees Scatman John, who stands in front of many backgrounds in different locations (through chroma key), as he sings about the problems of the world, and invites the viewer to join him in his fantasy world called Scatland. There are locations in London including Liverpool Street station, London Bridge and Oxford Circus. The song expresses hope and satirises the divide in the modern world between cultures and race. The video was later published on Scatman John's official YouTube channel in November 2013. It has amassed more than 20.9 million views as of June 2022.

Track listings

 CD1, Europe"Scatman's World" (Single Mix) — 3:40
"Scatman's World" (Club Mix) — 5:54
"Scatman's World" (House Mix) — 5:30
"Time (Take Your Time)" — 3:41

 CD2 (Remixes), Europe"Scatman's World" (Dance Remix) — 5:57
"Scatman's World" (DJ Hooligan's Underworld Remix) — 6:34
"Scatman's World" (Rave Remix) — 7:10
"Scatman's World" (House-Dub Remix) — 5:28
"Scatman's World" (Divas 70's Mix) — 5:49
"Scatman's World" (80's Mix) — 6:06

 CD3, Japan'
"Scatman's World" (Single Mix) — 3:40
"Scatman's World" (Club Mix) — 5:54
"Scatman's World" (House Mix) — 5:30
"Scatman's World" (80's Mix) — 6:08
"Scatman's Special Message for Japan Only" — 0:47

Charts and sales

Weekly charts

Year-end charts

Certifications

References

1995 singles
1995 songs
Ultratop 50 Singles (Flanders) number-one singles
Ultratop 50 Singles (Wallonia) number-one singles
European Hot 100 Singles number-one singles
Number-one singles in Finland
SNEP Top Singles number-one singles
Number-one singles in Germany
Number-one singles in Hungary
Number-one singles in Spain
RCA Records singles
Scatman John songs
Songs against racism and xenophobia
Internet memes introduced in 2019